The Magdalen Society of Philadelphia was a private charitable organization founded in 1800 to redeem prostitutes and other "fallen" women. This was the first association in the United States that sought to rescue and reform wayward women. A number of local clergymen and citizens affiliated with Quaker, Episcopal and Presbyterian denominations met to form the Society. Bishop William White, the nation's highest-ranking Episcopal bishop, was the first president of the Society, which officially incorporated in 1802. The organization was based on Magdalen hospitals in England and Ireland, which were named for Mary Magdalene. Similarly designated groups were soon started in other American cities in the early 19th century.

Background
The Magdalen Society of Philadelphia, a private charitable organization was founded in 1807. The stated purpose of Philadelphia's Magdalen Society was "restoring to the paths of virtue those unhappy females who in unguarded hours have been robbed of their innocence."  The president of the Society was Bishop William White, rector of Christ Church; the vice-president was Robert Wharton, mayor of Philadelphia.

It was operated by the Society's Board of Managers, and initially housed about a dozen prostitutes and other errant women. The Magdalen Asylum stood on this site for more than a century, until 1916. In 1988-1898, an archeological investigation of the site was conducted in connection with the construction of the Franklin Institute's Futures Center, which now overlaps the site.

Operation
The women that the asylum admitted were called magdalens and were assigned a number in the order they entered the facility. They were mostly young immigrant women between the ages of 17 and 23 who were aimless, family-less, unsupported and in need of help. They generally did not share the Magdalen Society's image of their "guilt and wretchedness," but instead simply sought a sanctuary from disease, the prison or almshouse, unhappy family situations, abusive men, and dire economic circumstances.

In its early years, the Magdalen Society Asylum functioned as a refuge for prostitutes. Most of these stayed only a few days or a few weeks, just long enough to get reclothed and recuperated. Attempts at rehabilitation met with little success. In 1877, the asylum was changed into a home for wayward girls, with a rule requiring a stay for twelve months. As the Magdalen Society Asylum became more selective, relaxed its emphasis on personal guilt and salvation, and standardized in some respects the treatment
of the inmates, its rate of failure diminished.

A much larger Magdalen Home was erected at the same locality in the 1840s. This building separated the inmates ("magdalens") from the staff, and recalcitrant inmates from new arrivals. Fences and eventually a 13-foot wall were built around the property to keep the magdalens from seeing or otherwise interacting with the encroaching city.

The Philadelphia Magdalen Society lodged 2,726 women in all, attempting to change them into domestic servants, factory workers, seamstresses or laundresses—and sometimes even returning the inmates to their families, hopefully with a more "proper" mindset. Still, even the Board of Managers conceded that few magdalens were converted to lives of virtue. So the Society began to focus on preventing waywardness and providing education to girls.

The Home for Magdalens moved to Montgomery County, Pennsylvania, in 1915, about the time that it was becoming clear that the refuge had outlived its usefulness. Other private organizations and state institutions had become concerned with the treatment of "delinquent" girls, and the asylum's functions had been taken over by city courts, which placed youthful offenders on probation rather than committing them to institutions.

White-Williams Foundation for Girls
The Society began to seek a new direction for its work. It wanted to find ways to prevent the delinquency it had worked to treat for over a hundred years. The Board of Managers voted to address the heart of the problem by providing direction and assistance to steer children away from trouble. Accordingly, the Magdalen Society changed its name to White-Williams Foundation for Girls in 1918. (The name honored Bishop William White and George Williams, a Quaker philanthropist and former Board chairman.) White-Williams began the service that it continues today: providing stipends to needy Philadelphia students. White-Williams Scholars visit area colleges, attend cultural events and career exploration workshops, and participate in peer support groups. Now known as White-Williams Scholars, the organization currently serves both male and female pupils in Philadelphia public high schools.

See also
White-Williams Scholars

Notes

References
De Cunzo, Lu Ann. Reform, Respite, Ritual: An Archaeology of Institutions; The Magdalen Society of Philadelphia, 1800-1850, published in Historical Archeology, volume 29, no. 3 (1995).

External links
The Magdalen Society of Philadelphia Records, including records of the Society from its formation in 1800 until 1918, are available for research use at the Historical Society of Pennsylvania.

Imprisonment and detention in the United States
Magdalene asylums
Feminism and history
1800 establishments in Pennsylvania
History of women in Pennsylvania